Africa's Next Top Model, cycle 1 is the first installment of a reality television show in which a number of women compete for the title of Africa's Next Top Model along with the chance to begin their career in the modeling industry. The show features aspiring models from the entire African continent.

The prize package for this cycle included a 1-year modeling contract with New York-based modelling agency DNA Model Management, a product endorsement deal with P&G, a 1-year contract as an ambassador for South African Tourism, SNAPP, Etisalat, and Verve, and a cash prize of 50,000 USD.

The winner of the competition was 21-year-old Aamito Lagum, representing the nation of Uganda.

Series summary

Auditions
Casting calls and auditions were held in several countries and on different dates, listed below:

6 July at Polana Serena Hotel, Maputo, Mozambique
9 July at Sandton Convention Center, Johannesburg, South Africa
14 July at Kenyatta International Conference Centre, Nairobi, Kenya
20 July at M Plaza Hotel, Accra, Ghana
23 July at Federal Palace Hotel, Lagos, Nigeria
28 July at Centro Cultural Paz Flor (Paz Flor Convention Centre), Luanda, Angola
1 August at Cape Town International Convention Centre, Cape Town, South Africa

After the selection process, 12 models were chosen to participate in the competition.

Requirements
All applicants were required to be between 18–27 years old at the time they auditioned or applied for the show. Additional requirements stated that if a model was being represented by a modeling agency at the time she applied, she had to terminate that representation prior. Contestants from any country in Africa were encouraged to apply. The minimum height requirement was 170 cm, or 5'7.

Cast
Contestants
(Ages stated are at start of contest)

Judges
 Oluchi Onweagba (host)
 Remi Adetiba 
 Josie Borain

Other cast members
 Carl Isaacs
 Crystal Birch

Episodes
Episode 1First aired 10 November 2013Episode 2First aired 17 November 2013Guest judge: Carl Isaacs

Episode 3First aired 24 November 2013Guest judge: Thula Sindi

Episode 4First aired 1 December 2013Guest judge: Malibongwe Tyilo

Episode 5First aired 8 December 2013Guest judge: Annabel Onyango

Episode 6First aired 15 December 2013Guest judge: Marianne Fassler

Episode 7First aired 22 December 2013Guest judge: Craig Port

Episode 8First aired 29 December 2013Guest judge: David Tlale

Episode 9First aired 5 January 2014Guest judge: Jackie Burger

Episode 10First aired 12 January 2014''

Guest judge: Butterfly Cayley

Results

 The contestant was eliminated
 The contestant was in a non-elimination bottom two
 The contestant won the competition

Average call-out order
Final episode is not included.

References

External links
Official website
Aamito at Models.com

Top Model
2013 South African television seasons
2014 South African television seasons